Mad Women is 2015 American drama film written and directed by Jeff Lipsky and starring Reed Birney.

Cast
Reed Birney as Richard
Eli Percy as Otto
Kelsey Lynn Stokes as Nevada
Christina Starbuck as Harper
Jamie Harrold as Anton
Sharon Van Ivan as Julianne

Release
The film was released theatrically in New York City on July 10, 2015 and in Los Angeles on July 24, 2015.

Reception
The film has a 0 percent rating on Rotten Tomatoes based on 7 reviews.

Sheila O'Malley of RogerEbert.com awarded the film half a star and wrote, "The plot of Mad Women is ridiculous, unmotivated and "shocking," but that wouldn't be an issue at all if there had been some attempt at style, or mood, or a point of view."

The Hollywood Reporter gave the film a negative review, calling it "A mess of a family drama wrapped up in some never-credible politics and more misshapen monologues than you could find in a freshman play-writing course..."

References

External links
 
 

2015 films
2015 drama films
American drama films
2010s English-language films
2010s American films
English-language drama films